Romiri is a hillside settlement on Zakynthos island, Greece. It is located between Lithakia and Machairado. It has 605 inhabitants (2011).

External links
hellenica.de
Romiri Project - Diadrasis

References

Populated places in Zakynthos